The Blondes is a 2019 scripted podcast based on the novel of the same name by Emily Schultz. It was released on July 8, 2019, starring Madeline Zima, Robert Belushi, Helen Hong, Dana Berger, and Cecilia Corrigan.

Background 
The first season follows several characters as they negotiate a world where a form of rabies afflicts blonde women. 

In June 2017, The Hollywood Reporter revealed that The Blondes would be among the first series to premiere on AMC Networks' Shudder streaming service. 

In 2019, Schultz regained the rights and collaborated with executive producer Duncan Birmingham along with directors Brian Joseph Davis and Jenny Grace to create a podcast that drew on the novel. 

In 2020, it was announced that the European podcast network, Sybel, will produce French and Spanish language versions of The Blondes podcast.

References

External links 
Spotify
Apple Podcasts
Shudder.com
Heroic Collective

2019 podcast debuts

AMC (TV channel) original programming
Scripted podcasts